The 1994 Indonesia Open in badminton was held in Yogyakarta, from August 8 to August 14, 1994. It was a five-star tournament and the prize money was US$166,000.

Venue
GOR Among Rogo

Final results

Men's singles

Women's singles

References
Smash: 1994 Indonesian Open
tournamentsoftware.com

External links
 Tournament Link

Indonesia Open (badminton)
Indonesia
Sports competitions in Yogyakarta
1994 in Indonesian sport